Ottawa Valley Railway  is a Canadian railway that operates  of track in the provinces of Ontario and Quebec, and is owned by Genesee & Wyoming Canada Inc., the Canadian subsidiary of Genesee & Wyoming Inc.

The railroad began operations on 30 October 1996 under the auspices of RaiLink Canada, and fell under the control of RailAmerica after that company bought RaiLink in July 1999. It was formed to operate both local trains and through-service Canadian Pacific Railway trains between Sudbury, Ontario and Smiths Falls, Ontario. On July 23, 2012, Genesee & Wyoming Inc. announced that it intended to purchase RailAmerica in a deal valued at $1.39 billion. Approval of the purchase was granted by the U.S. Surface Transportation Board on December 19, 2012.

Currently, the OVR operates between Sudbury and Temiscaming, Quebec, reduced from its original routing between Sudbury and Smiths Falls with a branch to Temiscaming.

The rerouting came about as a result of the reduction of both local traffic on the line and through traffic operated by the Canadian Pacific.  As traffic was reduced on other CP routes, that railway was able to redirect trains onto its lines through Toronto, and RailAmerica's lease on the line to the east of Petawawa, Ontario ended in December 2009. The OVR continued operating the route between Sudbury and Temiscaming, and in early October 2010, RailAmerica and CP reached a new agreement under which those operations would continue, while CP would continue procedures for ending service to the east of Mattawa. On 3 August 2011, it was announced that the rails between Renfrew and Pembroke, Ontario were planned to be removed by the end of the year, with the remainder of the Mattawa—Smiths Falls route to be removed in following years.

The OVR interchanges with the Canadian Pacific at Sudbury, as well as with the Canadian National Railway at North Bay, Ontario, the Ontario Northland Railroad at North Bay, and the Huron Central Railway at Sudbury.

The railway once hauled around 70,000 carloads a year, the majority of which came from CP's intermodal bridge traffic. The rest of it was self-generated, and included chemicals and forest products. Very little of this traffic came from east of Mattawa. As of 2013, carloadings amount to approximately 8,000 per year.

References

External links
Ottawa Valley Railway official webpage - Genesee and Wyoming website

Ontario railways
RailAmerica
Companies based in North Bay, Ontario
Railway companies established in 1996
Rail transport in Sudbury District
Rail transport in Greater Sudbury
Rail transport in Nipissing District
Rail transport in North Bay, Ontario
Rail transport in Renfrew County
Transport in Abitibi-Témiscamingue
Témiscamingue Regional County Municipality
Standard gauge railways in Canada